Leydi Laura Moya (born 16 April 1992), also known as Leidis Laura Moya, is a Cuban modern pentathlete. She competed for Cuba in the 2016 Summer Olympics where she finished 33rd. She competed for Cuba at the 2020 Summer Olympics.

References

External links 
 

1992 births
Living people
Cuban female modern pentathletes
Modern pentathletes at the 2016 Summer Olympics
Olympic modern pentathletes of Cuba
Modern pentathletes at the 2015 Pan American Games
Modern pentathletes at the 2019 Pan American Games
Pan American Games medalists in modern pentathlon
Pan American Games silver medalists for Cuba
Pan American Games bronze medalists for Cuba
Modern pentathletes at the 2010 Summer Youth Olympics
Youth Olympic gold medalists for Cuba
Medalists at the 2019 Pan American Games
Modern pentathletes at the 2020 Summer Olympics
20th-century Cuban women
21st-century Cuban women